Dénes Eszenyi (born 9 January 1968) is a retired Hungarian football striker.

References

1968 births
Living people
Hungarian footballers
People from Nyíregyháza
Újpest FC players
K.V. Mechelen players
Pécsi MFC players
Budapest Honvéd FC players
Hapoel Tzafririm Holon F.C. players
Bnei Yehuda Tel Aviv F.C. players
SV Eintracht Trier 05 players
Ferencvárosi TC footballers
Maccabi Petah Tikva F.C. players
Hapoel Ramat Gan F.C. players
Association football forwards
Belgian Pro League players
Liga Leumit players
Israeli Premier League players
Hungary international footballers
Hungarian expatriate footballers
Expatriate footballers in Belgium
Expatriate footballers in Germany
Expatriate footballers in Israel
Hungarian expatriate sportspeople in Belgium
Hungarian expatriate sportspeople in Germany
Hungarian expatriate sportspeople in Israel
Sportspeople from Szabolcs-Szatmár-Bereg County